Opilio canestrinii is a species of harvestman.

Males reach a body length  up to 6 mm, females up to 8 mm. While males are yellowish brown to reddish, females are lighter. Males have dark legs, but yellow coxae and "knees"; the legs of females show alternatingly light and dark rings. The backs of females sport a dark, saddle-like pattern with a light longitudinal stripe in the middle. Adults can be found from June to December.

Opilio canestrinii probably originates from Italy, but has invaded Central Europe since the late 1970, and has since almost everywhere replaced the similar O. parietinus. It is most often found on house walls.

References

Further reading
 Joel Hallan's Biology Catalog: Phalangiidae

Harvestmen
Arachnids of Europe
Animals described in 1876
Taxa named by Tamerlan Thorell